Thomas MacDonald Patterson (November 4, 1839 – July 23, 1916) was an American politician and newspaper publisher who served as a member of the United States Senate and United States House of Representatives from Colorado.

Early life
Patterson was born in County Carlow, Ireland, but his family emigrated to the United States when he was a boy, and they settled in New York City in 1849. A few years later, they moved to Crawfordsville, Indiana, where the young Patterson found work in a printing office and with a watchmaker and jeweler.

Career 
When the Civil War broke out in 1861, Patterson enlisted in the Eleventh Regiment of the Indiana Volunteer Infantry. He returned home in 1862, and went to college first at Indiana Asbury University (now DePauw University), then at Wabash College.

Patterson was admitted to the bar in 1867 and began his practice in Crawfordsville. In 1872, he moved to Denver, where he started a law practice and was city attorney in 1873 and 1874.

Patterson's political career began when he became a member of the Democratic National Committee in 1874 (a post he held until 1880). He was then elected as a Democrat to be a Delegate from the Colorado Territory to the 44th Congress (1875–76), stepping down when the Territory became a State. James B. Belford, a Republican, was initially elected as Colorado's first Congressman, but Patterson successfully contested his election and served in the U.S. House of Representatives in the 45th Congress (1877–79). Patterson chose not to stand for re-election in 1878.

After leaving Congress, Patterson resumed the practice of law in Denver and purchased first the Rocky Mountain News in 1890 and later the Denver Times. During these years, Patterson was twice an unsuccessful Democratic candidate for Governor of Colorado including in 1888, when he was defeated by Republican Job Adams Cooper.

Patterson returned to national politics in 1900 when he was elected as a Democrat to the United States Senate, serving a single term (1901–1907) and refusing to stand for re-election. While a senator, Patterson served on the United States Senate Committee on the Philippines, which investigated alleged war crimes committed during the Philippine–American War.

After leaving the Senate, Patterson published his newspaper until his death.

Death
Patterson died at his home in Denver on July 23, 1916. His remains are interred in Fairmount Cemetery.

See also
List of United States senators born outside the United States

References

External links
 Retrieved on 2008-02-14

1839 births
1916 deaths
Politicians from County Carlow
Irish emigrants to the United States (before 1923)
Delegates to the United States House of Representatives from Colorado Territory
Democratic Party members of the United States House of Representatives from Colorado
Democratic Party United States senators from Colorado
19th-century American politicians
American newspaper publishers (people)
Rocky Mountain News people
Wabash College alumni
DePauw University alumni
People of Indiana in the American Civil War
Union Army soldiers
19th-century American businesspeople